The Cătăuț is a right tributary of the river Râmnicul Sărat in Romania. It discharges into the Râmnicul Sărat in Buda.

References

Rivers of Romania
Rivers of Buzău County
Rivers of Vrancea County